The 1936 Vanderbilt Commodores football team represented Vanderbilt University as a member of the Southeastern Conference (SEC) during the 1936 college football season. Led by third-year head coach Ray Morrison, the Commodores compiled an overall record of 3–5–1 with a mark of 1–3–1 in conference play, finishing ninth in the SEC. They played their six home games at Dudley Field in Nashville, Tennessee. Vanderbilt began the season by shutting out Middle Tennessee and Chicago, but did not score a point over the next four games before shutting Sewanee for their third win of the season. On October 17, the Commodores lost, 16–0, to the SMU Mustangs. Morrison had served as head coach for the Mustangs from 1922 to 1934.

Schedule

References

Vanderbilt
Vanderbilt Commodores football seasons
Vanderbilt Commodores football